The Online Film Critics Society Award for Best Ensemble was an annual film award given by the Online Film Critics Society to honor the best ensemble of the year, given between 1998 and 2002.

Winners
1998: Saving Private Ryan 
Edward Burns, Matt Damon, Jeremy Davies, Vin Diesel, Adam Goldberg, Tom Hanks, Barry Pepper, Giovanni Ribisi and Tom Sizemore

1999: American Beauty 
Annette Bening, Wes Bentley, Thora Birch, Chris Cooper, Peter Gallagher, Allison Janney, Kevin Spacey and Mena Suvari

2000s
2000 (t): Almost Famous 
Fairuza Balk, Billy Crudup, Patrick Fugit, Philip Seymour Hoffman, Kate Hudson, Jason Lee, Frances McDormand, Anna Paquin, and Noah Taylor

2000 (t): State and Main 
Alec Baldwin, Philip Seymour Hoffman, Charles Durning, Sarah Jessica Parker, William H. Macy, David Paymer, Rebecca Pidgeon, and Julia Stiles

2001: Gosford Park 
Eileen Atkins, Bob Balaban, Sir Alan Bates, Charles Dance, Stephen Fry, Sir Michael Gambon, Richard E. Grant, Tom Hollander, Sir Derek Jacobi, Kelly Macdonald, Dame Helen Mirren, Jeremy Northam, Clive Owen, Ryan Phillippe, Kristin Scott Thomas, Dame Maggie Smith, Geraldine Somerville, Sophie Thompson, Emily Watson, and James Wilby

2002: The Lord of the Rings: The Two Towers 
Sean Astin, Cate Blanchett, Orlando Bloom, Billy Boyd, Brad Dourif, Bernard Hill, Christopher Lee, Ian McKellen, Dominic Monaghan, Viggo Mortensen, Miranda Otto, John Rhys-Davies, Andy Serkis, Liv Tyler, Hugo Weaving, David Wenham, and Elijah Wood

2017: Three Billboards Outside Ebbing, Missouri 
Frances McDormand, Woody Harrelson, Sam Rockwell, Abbie Cornish, John Hawkes, and Peter Dinklage

References

Film awards for Best Cast
Lists of films by award
Online Film Critics Society Awards